Double-Cross is a 2014 Ghanaian epic romantic thriller told, written, co-produced, by D.R. Kufuor. It stars Ama K. Abebrese and John Dumelo as the main cast of the movie. The movie was shot predominantly in the North Legon Area of Accra Ghana.

Cast

 Ama K. Abebrese as Effie Howard
 John Dumelo as Danny Frimpong
 Adjetey Anang as Ben Boateng
 Paulina Oduro as Obaabeng Frimpong
 Jasmine Baroudi as Vickie Mensah
 Samuel Odoi-Mensah as Johnny Yawson

Release
The World Première of Double-Cross was on October 31, 2014 at the Greenwich Odeon Cinema in London, England. The Ghana Première on February 6, 2014 at the Silverbird Cinema in Accra, Ghana.

Critical response
The film was met with generally positive reviews from critics. Babso.Org was impressed with the intrigue and suspense at the end and would say it was a good movie better than most of the movies seen and had to review. Ghana celebrities did not particularly like the ending contrary to many comments by the attendants.

Accolades

References

External links

 

2010s English-language films
English-language Ghanaian films